HHU refer to:
 Heinrich Heine University in Düsseldorf, Germany
 Hohai University in Nanjing, Jiangsu, China
 Huaihua University in Huaihua, Hunan, China